Solange Marilú Witteveen (born 6 February 1976) is a retired Argentine high jumper. She won a gold medal at the 1999 Pan American Games. She also represented Argentina at the 2000 Olympic Games in Sydney and the 2004 Olympic Games in Athens.

Career
Witteveen was born in Buenos Aires. Her personal best jump is 1.96 metres, achieved in September 1997 in Oristano. This is the current South American record.

Among her achievements, Witteveen won the 1997 South American Championships, the 1998 South American Games and the 1999 Pan American Games, as well as winning a bronze medal at the 1999 Summer Universiade. In both of her appearances at the Olympic Games, she cleared 1.89 m, finishing 20th overall in 2000 and 23rd in 2004.

In 2001, at the South American Championships, she jumped 1.97 metres which would be the new South American record. She, however, failed a doping test for a banned substance and was disqualified from competition for two years.

Competition record

Personal bests
Outdoor
100 metres hurdles – 14.62 (+1.5 m/s) (Buenos Aires 2006)
High jump – 1.96 (Oristano 1997)
Long jump – 6.27 (+0.3 m/s) (Montevideo 1999)
Triple jump – 12.43 (+1.3 m/s) (Buenos Aires 2006)
Indoor
High jump – 1.94 (Brno 2000)

References

External links
Sports reference biography

1976 births
Living people
Argentine female high jumpers
Athletes (track and field) at the 2000 Summer Olympics
Athletes (track and field) at the 2004 Summer Olympics
Athletes (track and field) at the 1995 Pan American Games
Athletes (track and field) at the 1999 Pan American Games
Athletes (track and field) at the 2003 Pan American Games
Athletes (track and field) at the 2007 Pan American Games
Olympic athletes of Argentina
Argentine people of Dutch descent
Athletes from Buenos Aires
Argentine sportspeople in doping cases
Doping cases in athletics
Pan American Games gold medalists for Argentina
Pan American Games medalists in athletics (track and field)
Universiade medalists in athletics (track and field)
South American Games gold medalists for Argentina
South American Games medalists in athletics
Competitors at the 1998 South American Games
Universiade medalists for Argentina
Medalists at the 1999 Summer Universiade
Medalists at the 1999 Pan American Games